Martin Joseph Bayly (born 14 September 1966) is an Irish former professional footballer and manager.

His older brother is Ritchie Bayly while his nephew Robert Bayly currently plays for Shamrock Rovers.

Career

Club career
Born in Dublin, Bayly began his professional career as a youth player with local side Little Bray and English team Wolverhampton Wanderers. Bayly made his senior debut on 21 April 1984 in a 3–0 loss to Ipswich Town in the First Division, the first of seven consecutive appearances. He won the club's Young Player of the Year Award for the season, but made just three further appearances in the 1984–85 season before being released in the summer. In total, Bayly made a total of ten appearances in the Football League for Wolves.

Bayly was then briefly on the books at Coventry City before returning to his native Ireland to join Sligo Rovers. Bayly won the PFAI Young Player of the Year Award in 1987.

While at Sligo, Bayly played in the last ever game at Glenmalure Park in April 1987. Bayly then guested for Shamrock Rovers in a tournament in South Korea in June 1987, before moving to Derry City in 1988. After a year in Spain with UE Figueres, Bayly returned to Ireland to play with a number of clubs including St Patrick's Athletic, Derry City, St James's Gate, Athlone Town and Monaghan United, before signing with Shamrock Rovers in May 1992. Bayly was released by Shamrock Rovers in January 1993,

International career
Bayly appeared for Ireland in the 1984 UEFA European Under-18 Football Championship and the 1985 FIFA World Youth Championship.

References

1966 births
Living people
Republic of Ireland association footballers
Republic of Ireland under-21 international footballers
Wolverhampton Wanderers F.C. players
Coventry City F.C. players
English Football League players
Sligo Rovers F.C. players
Derry City F.C. players
UE Figueres footballers
St Patrick's Athletic F.C. players
Athlone Town A.F.C. players
Monaghan United F.C. players
Shamrock Rovers F.C. players
Shamrock Rovers F.C. guest players
Home Farm F.C. players
Linfield F.C. players
League of Ireland XI players
League of Ireland players
League of Ireland managers
NIFL Premiership players
Home Farm F.C. coaches
St James's Gate F.C. players
Association football midfielders
Republic of Ireland football managers